MIDIbox is a non-commercial open source project with a series of guides on how to build musical instrument device interfaces (MIDI). Through a series of do it yourself tutorials, users are guided in the process of building a basic microcontroller that can also be used to build hardware MIDI control units for various synthesizers, multi-track recording software, and other MIDI devices; as well as stand-alone synthesizers, sequencers and other projects.

History 

The MIDIbox Hardware Platform is the continuation of Thorsten Klose's earlier work on  MIDI controllers. Designs are based around a standardized environment of reusable and exchangeable modules. Soon after the release of the first modules, a small group of enthusiasts formed and grew into a thriving open source development community.

The MIDIbox Hardware Platform (MBHP) 

The platform focuses on well-defined and documented modules based on small, uncomplicated circuits, to allow for amateur assembly. These modules are then assembled into a complete project.  All boards can be made as single-layer PCBs and prototype boards designed with a freeware CAD program. Almost all components are through-hole for easier assembly.

The first MIDIbox hardware platform, (MBHP), was based its own open-source operating system– MIOS (MIDIbox Operating System) –written in PIC assembly language, for speed and accuracy.  A C wrapper layer provides simplified coding.  MIOS is designed and documented to allow simple reconfiguration, adaptation, and extension by hobbyists and enthusiasts.

The new MIDIBox Hardware Platform, MIOS32, runs on ARM-based processors LPC1769, from NXP, and STM32F407, from STMicroelectronics, and is based on a Real Time Operating System (RTOS) derived from FreeRTOS. The toolchain for MIOS32 is based on GCC, and uses only C language.

The modules 
Currently, about 15 separate modules are available:

Microcontroller modules
Core Module
PIC Programmer Modules like an actual PIC-Burner or the JDM Module

Input modules
AIN Module Analog Input (0-5V)
DIN Module Digital Input (ON/OFF)

Output modules
DOUT Module Digital Output (e.g. LED ON/OFF)
LCD Module Liquid Crystal Display
AOUT Module Analog Out to output Voltages (for Controls)

Sequencer modules
SEQV4 Sequencer V4

SEQV4L Sequencer V4 Lite
SEQV3 Sequencer V3

Sound modules
SID Module for the MOS Technology SID (as found in the Commodore 64)
OPL3 Module for the FM-Chips YMF262 and YAC512
IIC SpeakJet Module for the SpeakJet SoundChip

Memory expansion modules
BankStick 32k / 64k Memory module

MIDI I/O modules
LTC Module MIDI LED Indicators + 1 MIDI-Out + 1 Thru (+ 1 optional to-COM-Port)
USB Modules PC/USB Interface

Miscellaneous modules
MF Module to control Motorfaders
IIC Modules to communicate to other (Microcontroller-)Devices via I2C

RTP-MIDI module
MIOS32 firmware includes direct link to KissBox OEM RTP-MIDI module over high-speed SPI

The MIDIbox Operating System (MIOS) 
The MIDIbox Operating System (MIOS) facilitates design of flexible MIDI controller applications.  MIOS adheres to a non-commercial, open platform as fundamental to the exchange of ideas and personal adaptations not possible with commercial controllers.

Most controllers built by the community are based on existing documented designs, and begin life with the feature set provided by the existing firmware. End users can enhance their devices with exchangeable program code, and customize them to suit their host application, synthesizer or other MIDI device.  Users can also customize to suit their own preferred workflow, or design a new project from scratch.

Application source code, module schematics and PCB layouts are available free for non-commercial  use as templates for modifications and improvements. Thus MIOS and the Hardware Platform allow an easy entry to hobbyist microcontroller development, while making possible applications outside the realms of the commercial, mainstream MIDI market.

MIOS was licensed under the GPL until version 1.8.  Later versions now require Thorsten Klose's permission for commercial use.

Specifications 
The operating system consist of a kernel that provides user hooks to hardware and software events, and functions for interaction with Hardware Platform modules.
One core module with a PIC18F452 microcontroller can handle
up to 128 digital inputs
up to 128 digital outputs
up to 64 analog inputs
character and graphical LCDs
up to 8 BankSticks                  (I2C EEPROMs)
one MIDI In and one MIDI Out, or an RS-232 serial COM port

Background drivers are available for the following control tasks:
MIDI I/O processing
Bootstrap loader
Analog conversion of up to 64 pots, faders or other analog sources with a 10-bit resolution
Motor handling for up to 8 motorized moving faders with a 10-bit resolution
Handling of up to 64 rotary encoders
Handling of up to 128 buttons, touch sensors or similar digital input devices
Handling of up to 128 LEDs, relays, Digital-Analog-Converters or similar output devices. In multiplex mode a nearly unlimited number of LEDs, LED rings and LED digits can be driven
Read/Write from/to EEPROM, Flash, and BankStick
Linking PIC18F Core modules via MIDIbox Link

The whole operating system has been written in assembly language and has been optimized for speed. 
MIOS currently uses 8k of program memory and 640 bytes of RAM.

Only 75 µs is required to read 128 digital input pins and to write to 128 output pins. 16 rotary encoders are handled within 100 µs. Analog inputs are scanned in the background every 200 µs; changes larger than a definable minimum range trigger a user hook.

Up to 256 MIDI events can trigger dedicated functions; processing of the event list requires about 300 µS. MIDI events can also be processed by a user routine for sysex parsing or similar jobs. A user timer is available for time triggered code.

Support for other high-level languages apart from C is possible.

MIOS hardware 
The MIOS hardware is organized around the concept of MIDIBox Hardware Platform (MBHP). The MBHP are highly versatile motherboards, offering the highest possible number of connections for a given processor. Four versions of MBHP are currently available:
MBHP for PIC16F877 and PIC18F452 (8 bits processors). The two chips are pin compatible, but the PCB needs a simple change between the two chips
MBHP for LPC1769 (32 bits ARM7 processor)
MBHP for STM32F407 (32 bits Cortex M4 processor)

When a project needs less I/O than the ones available on a given MBHP, the MIDIBox concept allows to create a simplified PCB dedicated to this project. This is the approach used on Sammich MIDIBox SID  and Sammich MIDIBox FM. These two kits contain the original MBHP design, but with a simplified PCB, dedicated to the connection with a SID chip or a YMF262 chip.

In the case of the STM32F407 MBHP, the CPU is mounted on a module used as a daughterboard, made by ST and sold as a development board (called STM32F4 Discovery by ST). The final user does not have to deal with SMD components, the daughterboard being mounted on standard 0.1" connectors

Complete solutions 
At this point there are 11 fully documented projects available, as well as a large number of user projects generated by the community.  The official projects are as follows:

MIDIbox SEQ V3:
16 Track Live Step and Morph Sequencer + advanced Arpeggiator

MIDIbox SID V1:
Hardware MIDI-controllable Synthesizer based on the MOS Technology SID (MOS6581) sound chip as shipped with the Commodore 64/128

MIDIbox FM V1:
Hardware synthesizer based on the Yamaha YMF262 sound chip (also known as OPL3) for generating the famous FM sounds known from Soundblaster (compatible) soundcards of the early 90s

MIDI Merger V1:
Merges two separate MIDI inputs to a single output

MIDI Router V1:
Routes various MIDIboxes to a single MIDI port

MIDI Processor:
Provides basic functionality to receive and transmit MIDI events

MIDIbox CV
Provides CV and gate outputs to drive voltage controlled devices such as analog modular synthesizers

MIDIbox 64:
Full-fledged 64 channel MIDI controller

MIDIbox 64E V2: 	
Extended version of the MIDIbox 64

MIDIO128 V2:
The MIDIO128 interface is used to drive up to 128 digital output pins and to react on up to 128 digital input pins via MIDI

MIDIbox LC V1:
Alternative to the MIDIbox 64/64E

MIDImon V2:
Reports events, which are transmitted over the MIDI cable, in a readable form

See also
 List of music software

References

External links
MIDIbox project website
the MIDIbox wiki
the MIDIbox forums
ucapps.de (Non-commercial DIY Projects for MIDI Hardware Geeks website)
The Protodeck: midibox controller designed for interact with Ableton Live used by protofuse

Do it yourself
Microcontroller software
Open-source music hardware
DIY electronic music hardware
MIDI